Angelique Kerber was the reigning champion, but chose to compete in Båstad instead.

Johanna Konta won her first WTA title, defeating Venus Williams in the final, 7–5, 5–7, 6–2.

Williams was attempting to win her third title in Stanford and 50th WTA title overall.

Seeds
The top four seeds received a bye into the second round.

Draw

Finals

Top half

Bottom half

Qualifying

Seeds
The top two seeds received a bye into the qualifying competition.

Qualifiers

Draw

First qualifier

Second qualifier

Third qualifier

Fourth qualifier

External links
 WTA tournament draws

2016 US Open Series
Bank of the West Classic - Singles
2016 Singles
Singles